is an amusement park in Hirakata, Osaka, Japan, nicknamed "Hirapah".

History
Hirakata Park is the oldest amusement park in Osaka, Japan. It opened in 1910, when Kikuningyō-ten, the "Chrysanthemum Figure Exhibition," was held near Keihan Hirakata Station (later renamed Hirakata-kōen Station).

In 1965, a public pool was built, which promoted swimming at Hirakata Park. Seven years later an ice rink was built to increase the park's attendance during the winter months. In 1988, the “Red Falcon" roller-coaster was built, followed by the construction of a Ferris wheel in 1991.

Around 2000, Hirakata Park's was touched by the general decline of the industry, resulting in the closure of many amusement parks in the Kinki region. This was caused by the ageing population, and also competition from Universal Studios Japan that was built in Osaka in 2001. Despite having debt, Hirakata Park managed to remain open.  In April 2009, the park started using popular figures as promotion ambassadors under the name "Hirapā Nīsan". The following years, Hirakata Park grew in popularity and paid off its debt.

Current Directors
The first Hirapā Nīsan in April 2009 was Ryūichi Kosugi, a Japanese entertainer. He aimed to break the Guinness World Record for number of visitors. He retired in March 2013, and Junichi Okada, a Japanese TV performer, was elected as his successor in April 2013. Being born in Hirakata, he successfully boosted the popularity of the park, especially in Kantō and Kyūshū.

Facilities

Attractions
There are 45 attractions in the park.

On April 5, 2014, the park also started with blindfolded rides on its attractions the Giant Drop Meteor, the Mokusei Coaster Elf (木製コースター　エルフ) and Uncle Frodo no Korottorokko (アンクル･フロドのころっとろっこ).

Other play areas include swimming pools in the summer, skating rinks and Snow Land.

List
Mokusei Coaster Elf (木製コースター　エルフ)
Troll panic Pachanga
Yūreiza (幽霊座)
Octopus Panic
Legend of Luxor
Kite Flier
Wave Swinger
Giant Drop Meteor
Guruguruō (ぐるぐる王)
Red Falcon
Waterfall of Screaming Bash
Hairpin Coaster Crazy Mouse
Karakuri Yashiki Makafusigidō (からくりやしき摩訶不思議堂)
3-D Laser Battle Makai no Mori Densetu (3Dレーザーバトル　魔界の森伝説)
Merry-go-round
Fantasy Cruise
Gnome Train
Rowdy
Strawberry café (Teacup)
Honey Hacchi (ハニーハッチ)　
Burning Fight
Kachinkochin (カチンコチン)
Itazura Mazyo no Labyrinth (いたずら魔女のラビリンス)
Putter Golf
Sky Walker
Cycle Monorail
Card Meiro Gurui Mori Daibōken 2 (カード迷路　ぐるり森の大冒険2)
Anpanman Happy Sky
Circuit 2000
Dolphin Paradise
Fan Fan Journey
Adventure Safari
Fantasy Castle
World Derby
Panic Racer
Pipin to Poppy no Kurukuru Helicopter (ピピンとポピーのくるくるヘリコプター)
Uncle Frodo no Korottorokko (アンクル･フロドのころっとろっこ)
Wizard's Magical Jumping
Dowsing Mountain
Dōbutsu Haguhagu Town (どうぶつハグハグたうん)
Kids Square
Hushigi Kouzan (ふしぎ鉱山)
Arcade Game Festa
Game House Joy Box

See also
History of amusement parks in Japan

References

External links

Official website 

Hirakata, Osaka
Amusement parks opened in 1910
1910 establishments in Japan
Amusement parks in Japan
Tourist attractions in Osaka Prefecture
Buildings and structures in Osaka Prefecture